The Trung Sơn Dam (Dự Án Nhà máy Thủy điện Trung Sơn) is a hydroelectric power station on the Ma River in northwestern Vietnam. The dam created a reservoir which covers a large area of the Mường Lát and Quan Hóa Districts in the Thanh Hoa province as well as part of the Mộc Châu District in Sơn La Province. The 260 MW associated power plant became fully operational in September 2017.

The Project
The Trung Sơn hydropower project is owned by Trung Sơn Hydropower Company Limited (TSHPCo), the entity established by Vietnam Electricity (EVN) in Decision No. 106/QD-ENV dated March 17, 2011.  TSHPCo is responsible for the management, construction and operation of the Trung Sơn hydropower project.

The project provides both power generation and flood control.  The powerhouse is designed to contain four generating units with a total capacity of 260 MW and an annual output of 1,018.61 GWh,, a significant addition to the national grid.  The flood control storage of  will help prevent floods downstream.

The project cost a total of VND 7,775,146 million (equivalent to US $410.68 million).  This includes US $330 million from a World Bank loan, which was signed by the Socialist Republic of Vietnam and the World Bank on June 28, 2011.  Additionally, the project was given slightly over US $80 million from the counterpart fund of (EVN).

The project has created social, environmental and community relation programs to mitigate anticipated and unanticipated issues with populations either directly or indirectly impacted, the Resettlement, Livelihoods and Ethnic Minorities Development Program (RLDP).  These populations consist of approximately 10,600 people (2,327 households), of which 7,012 (1,516 households) will be directly impacted in the main project area, resulting in a total of 533 households having to be resettled.  The RLDP includes a Resettlement Plan (RP), a Community Livelihoods Improvement Plan (CLIP) and an Ethnic Minorities Development Plan (EMDP).

In addition, management has prepared a Supplementary Environmental and Social Impact Assessment (SESIA) with Environmental Management Plan (EMP) for the project.  This plan includes principles, approaches, procedures and methods to be used to control and minimize environmental impacts of all project-related construction and operation activities.  Compared with fossil-fuel based energy plants of the same size, the dam produces far less greenhouse gas emissions (GHGs). TSHPCo maintains a website at www.trungsonhp.vn where public information is routinely updated.

Main parameters
 Catchment basin area: 
 Reservoir volume: 
 Reservoir area when at full capacity: 
 Full capacity water level: 
 Minimum operating water level: 
 Maximum flood control storage: 
 Regular flood control storage: 
 Installed electrical capacity : 260 MW
 Annual electrical output: 1,018.61 GWh
 Dam crest length: 
 Dam width at the top: 
 Dam height: 
 A power plant containing four 65 MW Francis turbines (total installed capacity of 260 MW), each designed for a maximum water head of 
 A 65-kilometer, 220-kV transmission line connecting to the national grid
 A 20.4-km access road

Components
The project is composed of four components:
 Dam and Ancillary Construction:  (i) Dam and ancillary works; (ii) Access road and bridges; (ii) Temporary transmission line to supply power for construction; and (iv) Project management
 Permanent power transmission line: 220 kV double-circuit line to connect to the national grid in the Tan Lac district
 Social and environment impact mitigation concerns: (i) Resettlement; (ii) Livelihoods and ethnic minorities development; (iii) Public health support; and (iv) Environmental management
 Capacity development and scale-up: Support to bring hydropower projects up to international standards

Allocation of World Bank US$ 330 million loan

Key milestones
 Commencement of main civil works: November 2012
 River diversion:           Quarter 4, 2013
 Impoundment:     October 2016
 Operation of Unit No. 1:  Quarter 4, 2016
 Operation of Unit No. 4:  Quarter 2, 2017

References
TrungSon Project brief from Worldbank Việt Nam - Dự Án Nhà máy Thủy điện Trung Sơn

External links

Trung Sơn HP
Worldbank

Buildings and structures in Thanh Hóa province
Hydroelectric power companies
Hydroelectric power stations in Vietnam
Dams in Vietnam